The year 1944 saw a number of significant happenings in radio broadcasting history.

Events

11 January – Fireside chat by the President of the United States: State of the Union Message to Congress.
28 March – New York City radio station WQXR (now WFME) bans singing commercials from being broadcast on its station.
30 April – (Six days before) The American Broadcasting Station in Europe (ABSIE) is established, transmitting from the United Kingdom in English, German, French, Dutch, Danish, and Norwegian to resistance movements in mainland Europe.
5 June
Fireside chat: On the Fall of Rome.
 One day before D-Day, the BBC transmits coded messages (including the second line of a poem by Paul Verlaine) from Britain to underground resistance fighters in France warning that the invasion of Europe is about to begin.
6 June – D-Day: United States Army Colonel R. Ernest Dupuy, news chief to Supreme Headquarters Allied Expeditionary Force, officially announces today's Normandy landings on radio in a broadcast at 3:32 am Eastern War Time (12:32 am Pacific Time). BBC reports of the landings are carried by around 725 of the 914 broadcasting stations in the United States.
12 June – Fireside chat: Opening Fifth War Loan Drive (last fireside chat).
25 July – The New York Times acquires the Interstate Broadcasting Company, parent of WQXR (now WFME) and WQXQ-FM (later WQXR; frequency becomes home to WXNY-FM) from John V. L. Hogan for $1 million American dollars. The Times will program the AM station until December 1998, and own the FM station until October 2009.
26 October – With fascism defeated in most parts of Italy, the national broadcasting organization Ente Italiano per le Audizioni Radiofoniche (EIAR) is overhauled and renamed Radio Audizioni Italiane (RAI), the future Radiotelevisione Italiana.
10 December – Italian conductor Arturo Toscanini leads a concert performance of the first half of Beethoven's Fidelio (minus its spoken dialogue) in German on NBC Radio in the United States, starring Rose Bampton. He chooses this opera for its political message: a statement against tyranny and dictatorship, intending it as a tribute to the German people who are being oppressed by Hitler. The second half is broadcast a week later. The performance is later released on LP and CD, the first of 7 operas that Toscanini conducts on radio.

Debuts
 (undated) – The Count of Monte Cristo debuts on the Don Lee Network. 
5 January – The Frank Sinatra Show debuts on CBS.
25 January – The black maid character Beulah, played by white male actor Marlin Hurt, debuts on Fibber McGee and Molly. In 1945, Beulah received her own spin-off show.
15 February – Creeps by Night debuted on the Blue Network. 
7 March – Columbia Presents Corwin, hosted by Norman Corwin, debuts on CBS.
19 April – Arthur Hopkins Presents debuts on NBC. 
23 April – The Adventures of Bill Lance debuts on CBS West Coast network.
5 May – The American Women's Jury debuts on Mutual. 
20 May – Eddie Condon's Jazz Concerts debuts on the Blue Network.
June – War Report debuts on the BBC.
13 June – The Charlotte Greenwood Show debuts on NBC.
20 June – The Dick Haymes Show debuts on NBC. 
23 June – Boston Blackie debuts on NBC. 
28 June – The Alan Young Show debuts on NBC. 
13 August – The Jackie Gleason-Les Tremayne Show debuts on NBC.
31 August – The Frank Morgan Show debuts on NBC.
20 September – The Electric Hour debuts on CBS. 
8 October – The Adventures of Ozzie and Harriet debuts on CBS.
11 December – The Chesterfield Supper Club debuts on NBC.

Closings
8 January - Foreign Assignment ends its run on network radio (Mutual). 
14 January - The Black Hood ends its run on network radio (Mutual). 
2 February - Battle of the Sexes ends its run on network radio (NBC). 
26 February - Campana Serenade ends its run on network radio (CBS). 
30 April - Ceiling Unlimited ends its run on network radio (CBS). 
5 June - Ed Sullivan Entertains ends its run on network radio (CBS).
23 June - American Women ends its run on network radio (CBS).
26 June - Broadway Showtime ends its run on network radio (CBS). 
30 June - Brave Tomorrow ends its run on network radio (NBC).  
5 August - Blue Ribbon Town ends its run on network radio (CBS). 
15 August - Creeps by Night ends its run on network radio (Blue Network). 
2 September - Abie's Irish Rose ends its run on network radio (NBC).
22 September - Helpmate ends its run on network radio (NBC).
24 September - Deadline Dramas ends its run on network radio (Blue Network). 
21 October - Babe Ruth ends its run on network radio (NBC).  
22 October - The Jackie Gleason-Les Tremayne Show ends its run on network radio (NBC).
19 November - Hot Copy ends its run on network radio (NBC-Blue. 
(undated) - The Black Castle (radio program) ends its run on network radio (Mutual).

Births
7 January – Jim Bohannon, American television and radio personality and nationally syndicated talk show host
28 March – Rick Barry, American former NBA player and broadcaster
12 May – Brian Kay, English bass singer and radio music presenter
5 June – Nigel Rees, English radio broadcaster
24 August – Mike Barnicle, American long-time newspaper writer and radio personality based in Boston
8 October – Dale Dye, American actor, technical advisor, radio personality and writer
24 October – Dr. Joy Browne, American radio psychologist syndicated by the WOR Radio Network
28 October – Gerry Anderson, Northern Irish radio broadcaster (died 2014)
November – Jim Eldridge, English scriptwriter
25 December – Kenny Everett, born Maurice Cole, British DJ (died 1995)
Christine Craft, American radio talk show host, previously television anchorperson

Deaths
28 June – Philippe Henriot, 55, Vichy French propaganda broadcaster and writer (assassinated)
16 November – Boake Carter, 45, American news commentator since the 1930s

References

 
Radio by year